Craig Millar may refer to:
 Craig Millar (ice hockey)
 Craig Millar (rugby union)

See also
 Craig Miller (disambiguation)
 Craigmillar, an area of Edinburgh, Scotland
 Craigmillar, Alberta, a locality in Alberta, Canada